Pexicopia paliscia is a moth of the family Gelechiidae. It was described by Ian Francis Bell Common in 1958. It is found in Australia, where it has been recorded from Queensland and New South Wales.

References

Moths described in 1958
Pexicopia